Nepadutant (INN) (code name MEN-11420) is a glycosylated bicyclic cyclohexapeptide drug which acts as a highly selective NK2 receptor antagonist. It was developed by the Menarini Group and investigated for the treatment of functional gastrointestinal disorders and asthma but was never marketed.

See also
 GR-159,897
 Ibodutant
 Saredutant

References

Acetamides
Antispasmodics
Bronchodilators
Tryptamines
NK2 receptor antagonists